Pennsylvania Railroad class E3b was an experimental electric locomotive supplied by Westinghouse Electric & Manufacturing Co. The locomotive was of the two unit design, with each unit having a B-B-B (AAR) or Bo-Bo-Bo (UIC) wheel arrangement. The bodywork and running gear was produced by Baldwin-Lima-Hamilton while the electrical equipment was provided by Westinghouse, who also acted as the main contractor.

In 1952 and 1953 the Pennsylvania Railroad took delivery of ten experimental locomotives, six from General Electric and four from Westinghouse. While GE's were all of the same class (E2b), the Westinghouse locomotives were split into two classes. Two locomotives had two three-axle trucks (E3c), while the other two had three two-axle trucks (E3b).

The locomotives were scrapped in 1964.

Footnotes

References
 
 
 

11 kV AC locomotives
E3b
Bo-Bo-Bo locomotives
Baldwin locomotives
Experimental locomotives
Westinghouse locomotives
Electric locomotives of the United States
Standard gauge locomotives of the United States
Railway locomotives introduced in 1951

Streamlined electric locomotives